Ireland has an extensive network of public roads which connect all parts of the country with each other. Roads in Ireland are currently classified as motorways, National Primary routes, National secondary routes, Regional roads and Local roads. The introduction of this classification system began in 1977.

Prior to this, the Republic of Ireland had a different road classification and numbering system. Roads fell into three categories: T (Trunk Roads), L (Link Roads) and unclassified roads.  These largely correspond to modern N and R roads in Ireland

The origins of this system lie in pre-independence legislation: the preliminary section of  Statutory Instrument S.I. No. 55/1926 — Road Signs and Traffic Signals Regulations, 1926 states that the Ministry of Transport Act, 1919 gave the Minister for Local Government and Public Health the power to assign a "route letter and number" to a road, while Section 6.4 of Part I of the Regulations specifies the positioning of the "route letter and the number of the road" on directional signs. The Statutory Instrument refer to the "classification of roads as a 'Trunk' or 'Link' Road".

In early 1926 the Minister made a Main Road Order which came into legal effect on 1 April 1926. The contents of this proposed order were communicated to local authorities in advance., this initial Main Road Order established the initial T Road and L Road networks in each county in 1926 and required county councils to maintain these main roads.

A reply to a question in parliament, given in 1964, described the Main Road Order process.

"Subsequently, in the period 1925-26, a further classification of roads was made pursuant to the Local Government Act, 1925, into main, county and urban roads, for the purpose of apportioning statutory responsibility for construction and maintenance, and for determining the chargeability of roads expenses for the purposes of annual estimates. The 1925 Act classification, like the 1919 Act classification, was also made after consultation with the local authorities, and the roads which were declared to be main roads were the trunk and link roads of the 1919 Act classification together with some additional roads decided upon after the consultation which I have mentioned."

Even though legal authority for the erection of directional signposts was given to local councils, the Automobile Association of Ireland began an extensive road signposting scheme in 1938 which included comprehensive signposting of routes from Belfast, Cork and Dublin.

Evidence that the Trunk Road and Link Road classification and numbering system had been well established by the 1950s is found in  Statutory Instrument S.I. No. 284/1956 — Traffic Signs Regulations, 1956 which contains examples of several directional signs. The first and second examples show the T8 as the route to Wexford and Rosslare. In addition, Esso road-maps of Ireland from the 1950s show the Trunk and Link road network. Despite its long-standing use, the original Trunk and Link road system was never legislated for and the routes of Trunk Roads and Link Roads were never formally designated by law.

This current system of road classification and numbering has its origins in the late 1960s: the Minister for Local Government, Kevin Boland, announced on 23 July 1969 that a national road network would be formed. In 1974, the  Local Government (Roads and Motorways) Act came into effect. It allowed for designation of roads as motorways or national roads. National roads were first designated by  Statutory Instrument S.I. No. 164/1977 on 1 June 1977. Twenty-five National Primary routes (N1-N25) and thirty-three National Secondary routes (N51-N83) were initially designated.

The changeover to the new system was gradual: a route planning map of Ireland from the late 1970s (or early 1980s), divided into a  northern section and a  southern section, shows a mixture of Trunk Road, Link Road and National route numbers.

Trunk Roads and Link Roads

Major roads within the Republic of Ireland were marked with "T" for Trunk Road, less important roads were marked with "L" for Link Road.

Trunk Roads connected major towns to each other while passing through smaller towns and villages.

Several trunk routes were designed to connect towns in different regions of Ireland (for example, the T41 from Enfield to Kilrush, via Tullamore, Portumna, Scariff and Ennis) while other roads (for example, the T66 Ring of Kerry route) were designated scenic routes.

Link Roads connected smaller towns and villages to each other and to the Trunk Road network.

There were eighty-four Trunk Roads in total, numbered from T1 to T77 consecutively (plus T4a, T11a, T12a, T21a, T28a, T50a and T72a). Roads with the 'a' suffix branched off roads with the same number. For example, the T4a branched off the T4 at Ballinasloe in County Galway and the T12a branched off the T12 to serve Cóbh in County Cork.

The first nine Trunk Roads (T1, T2, T3, T4, T4a, T5, T6, T7, T8) radiated out from Dublin (with the T8 branching off the T7 at Enniscorthy) and followed an anti-clockwise pattern. This pattern was similar to the existing anti-clockwise pattern which the National routes and motorways radiating out of Dublin now follow. The pattern was interrupted by the T35 (Dublin-Cavan-Donegal route) which came between the T2 and the T3 and the T42 (now N81), T43 and T44 which came between the T5 (T6) and the T7 routes.

Unlike the present system, where each road (whether N- or R-) has a unique number, under the Trunk and Link Road system, Link Roads were numbered separately beginning with L1. These L (for Link Road) numbers are not related to the current Lxxxx numbers for Local Roads.

Confusingly, some old road signs still show the former (now obsolete) Trunk and Link road-numbers.

Trunk Roads were broadly equivalent to the present National routes, and Link Roads to the present Regional roads. Most of the National Primary and National Secondary routes had been Trunk Roads and generally they followed the routes of these Trunk Roads, albeit with a different numbering system. However, some National Primary and Secondary routes also incorporated Link Roads and unclassified roads into their routes. After the introduction of the new road numbering system, some Trunk Roads (either in whole or in part) were downgraded to Regional roads, effectively 'de-trunked'Trunk road#De-trunking: Ireland.

A notable feature of the former system was multiplexing (or concurrency), where a section of road was designated by two or more route numbers.  Examples of multiplexes include the T7/T12 multiplex between New Ross and Waterford, the T6/T13 multiplex between Cahir and Kilheffernan (east of Clonmel), the T28/T36 multiplex between Newcastlewest and Abbeyfeale and the short T19/T21 multiplex between Thurles and Toor. The road between Cavan, Butlersbridge, Cloverhill and the border with Northern Ireland (near Wattle Bridge in County Fermanagh) was a triple multiplex of the T10, T15 and T35 routes.

Three routes (T15, T22, T35) had sections which were disconnected from the rest of the route by roads which crossed through Northern Ireland. These routes lost their Trunk Road designations through Northern Ireland, regaining them on exiting Northern Ireland. The T15 crossed the border several times between Cavan and Clones, alternating between the T15 and the A3 designations.

List of former trunk roads in Ireland

Multiplex sections, where two or more trunk roads ran concurrent with each other, are shown in italics. Sections through Northern Ireland, with A and B road designations, are shown in bold.

See also
Roads in Ireland
Roads in Northern Ireland
Motorways in the Republic of Ireland
National primary road
National secondary road
History of roads in Ireland
Road signs in the Republic of Ireland
Transport in Ireland

References

External links
 Ministry of Transport Act, 1919
 S.I. No. 55/1926 — Road Signs and Traffic Signals Regulations, 1926
 S.I. No. 284/1956 — Traffic Signs Regulations, 1956
 Local Government (Roads and Motorways) Act, 1974
 S.I. No. 164/1977 — Local Government (Roads and Motorways) Act, 1974 (Declaration of National Roads) Order, 1977.

Lists of roads in Ireland
Road transport in Ireland
 
 

de:Straßensystem in Irland
fr:Liste des autoroutes d'Irlande
ga:Bóithre agus mótarbhealaí in Éirinn
gv:Raaidyn ayns Pobblaght Nerin
it:Strade irlandesi